The 2022–23 Nicholls Colonels women's basketball team represented Nicholls State University during the 2022–23 NCAA Division I women's basketball season. The Colonels, led by fifteenth year head coach DoBee Plaisance, played their home games at Stopher Gym located in Thibodaux, Louisiana as members of the Southland Conference.  The Colonels finished the 2022–23 season with a 5–24 overall record and a 2–16 record for last place in Southland Conference play.  They failed to qualify for the 2023 Southland Conference women's basketball tournament.

Previous season
The Colonels finished the 2021–22 season with a 4–22 overall record and a 2–12 record in Southland Conference play.  They participated in the 2022 Southland Conference women's basketball tournament as the No. 8 seed.  Their season ended with a first round 73–74 defeat to No. 5 seeded Incarnate Word.

Preseason polls

Southland Conference Poll
The Southland Conference released its preseason poll on October 25, 2022. Receiving 25 votes overall, the Colonels were picked to finish tenth in the conference.

Preseason All Conference
No Colonels were selected as members of the Preseason All Conference first team.

Roster

Schedule
Sources:

|-
!colspan=12 style=";"| Non-conference regular season

|-
!colspan=12 style=";"| Southland regular season

See also
2022–23 Nicholls Colonels men's basketball team

References

Nicholls Colonels women's basketball seasons
Nicholls State
Nicholls
Nicholls